Eric Lionel Clarke (born 9 April 1933) is a politician in the United Kingdom. He served as Labour Member of Parliament for Midlothian from 1992 until he stepped down at the 2001 general election.

He had been an opposition whip from 1994 to 1997. He served as General Secretary of the Scottish National Union of Mineworkers during the 1980s Miner's Strike and took a proactive role in the care of members' families.

References

External links 
 

1933 births
Living people
National Union of Mineworkers-sponsored MPs
Scottish Labour MPs
UK MPs 1992–1997
UK MPs 1997–2001